

0–9
101 Strings
"Disco Fever" (1979), "Bye Bye Blackbird" (1979)
5000 Volts
"I'm On Fire" (1975) (lead vocal performed by Tina Charles), "Dr Kiss Kiss" (1976),
5th Dimension
"Love Hangover" (1976), "Star Dancing" (1978), "You Are The Reason I Feel Like Dancing" (1978)

A
ABBA
"Dancing Queen" (1976), "Take a Chance on Me" (1977), "Summer Night City" (1978), "Money Money Money" (1978), "Gimme! Gimme! Gimme! (A Man After Midnight)" (1979), "Voulez Vous" (1979), "As Good As New" (1979), "Does Your Mother Know" (1979), "Super Trouper" (1980), "On And On And On" (1980) "Lay All Your Love On Me" (1980), "The Visitors" (1981)
Ace
"How Long" (1974)
Al Hudson and the Partners
"Spread Love" (1978), "You Can Do It" (1979), "Happy Feet" (1979)
Peter Allen
"I Go To Rio" (1977)
Alton McClain & Destiny
"It Must Be Love" (1978), "Crazy Love" (1979)
Bill Anderson
"I Can't Wait Any Longer" (1978), "Double S" (1978)
Andrea True Connection
"More More More" (1976), "Party Line" (1976), "What's Your Name, What's Your Number" (1977), "N.Y., You Got Me Dancing" (1977), "Fill Me Up (Heart to Heart)" (1977)
Ruby Andrews (R&B, disco)
"Queen of the Disco" (1977)
Paul Anka
"One Man Woman/One Woman Man" (1975)
Ann-Margret
"Love Rush (In E-Minor)" (1979), "Midnight Message" (1979), "Everybody Needs Somebody Sometime" (1981)
Arabesque
"Hello, Mr. Monkey"  "Friday Night" (1978), "Peppermint Jack" (1979) 
Archie Bell & the Drells
"Let's Go Disco" (1976), "Let's Groove" (1976), "The Soul City Walk" (1976), "Everybody Have A Good Time" (1977), "Don't Let Love Get You Down" (1977), "Strategy" (1979)
Arthur Fiedler and the Boston Pops Orchestra
"Saturday Night Fever Medley" (1979), "Bachmania" (1979)
Ashford & Simpson
"Over and Over" (1976), "It Seems to Hang On" (1978), "Get Up and Do Something" (1978), "Flashback" (1978), "Found A Cure" (1979), "Nobody Knows" (1979), "Dance Forever" (1979), "Solid" (1984)
Atlantic Starr
"Stand Up" (1978), "Being In Love With You Is So Much Fun" (1978), "Keep It Comin'" (1978), "Straight to the Point" (1979)
Frankie Avalon
"Venus" (1976)
Roy Ayers
"Running Away" (1977), "Get On Up, Get On Down" (1978), "Fever" (1979), "Love Will Bring Us Back Together" (1979)

B
B.T. Express
"Do It" (1974), "Express" (1974), "Peace Pipe" (1975), "Energy To Burn" (1976), "Expose Yourself" (1977)
Babe Ruth
”Elusive” (1975)
Baccara
"Yes Sir, I Can Boogie" (1977), "Sorry I'm A Lady" (1978), "Parlez Vous Francais" (1979)
Baciotti (France)
"Black Jack" (1977) 
J.J. Barnes
"How Long" (1977)
Barrabás
"Woman" (1971), "Hi-Jack" (1974), "Mellow Blow" (1975), "Broadway Star" (1976), "Desperately" (1976), "On the Road Again" (1981), "Please Mr Reagan, Please Mr Breznev" (1982)
Claudja Barry
"Sweet Dynamite" (1977), "Dancin' Fever" (1977), "Love Machine" (1977), "Sunshine Love" (1978), "Boogie-Woogie Dancin' Shoes" (1979), "Love Of The Hurtin' Kind" (1979), "Boogie Tonight" (1979), "Radio Action" (1981), "Work Me Over" (1983), "Born To Love" (1983), "I Will Follow Him" (1985), "Down And Counting" (1986), "Reach Out For Me" (1997)
Peter Batah
"Rock Me Now" (1980), "Nobody's Stopping You" (1981)
Bazuka
"Dynomite" (1975), "(C'est) Le Rock" (1979)
Celi Bee
"Macho (A Real Real One)" (1977), "Superman" (1978), "One Love" (1978), "Love Drops" (1979), "Fly Me on the Wings of Love" (1979), "Donkey, Donkey" (1979)
Bee Gees
"Jive Talkin'" (1975), "Nights On Broadway" (1975), "You Should Be Dancing" (1976), "You Stepped Into My Life" (1976), "Love So Right" (1976), "Can't Keep A Good Man Down" (1976), "Subway" (1976), "Boogie Child" (1977), "Stayin' Alive" (1977), "Night Fever" (1978), "More Than A Woman" (1978), "Tragedy" (1979), "Love You Inside Out" (1979)
Bell & James
"Livin' It Up (Friday Night)" (1978)
Belle Epoque
"Miss Broadway" (1977), "Disco Sound/Black is Black" (1977)
George Benson
"On Broadway" (1977), "Give Me The Night" (1980), "Love X Love" (1980), "Never Give Up On A Good Thing" (1982), "Turn Your Love Around" (1982)
Asha Bhosle (India)
"Mil Gaya Humko Saathi" (1977), "Jab Chaye Mera Jadoo" (1980), Pyaar Karnewale" (1982), "Disco Station" (1982), "Dil Le Gayi" (1997), "Khallas" (2003)
Biddu Orchestra
"A Man and a Woman" (1976), "Voodoo Man" (1976), "Driving in the Rain" (1977), "The Stud" (1977), "Soul Coaxing" (1978), "James Bond Disco Theme" (1978)
Bill Summers and Summers Heat
"Dancing Lady" (1978), "Musicland" (1979)
Bionic Boogie
"Risky Changes" (1977), "Hot Butterfly" (1978), "Fess Up To The Boogie" (1978), "Cream Always Rises To Top" (1978)
Stephen Bishop
"Save It for a Rainy Day" (1976)
Cilla Black
"Silly Boy" (1978), "Sugar Daddy" (1978)
Jay Black
"One-Night Affair" (1977), "Love Is in the Air" (1979)
Blondie
"Heart Of Glass" (1979), "Atomic" (1980), "Call Me" (1980), "Rapture" (1981)
Blue Magic
"Look Me Up" (1973), "We're on the Right Track" (1975)
The Bob Crewe Generation
"Street Talk" (1976), "Menage a Trois" (1978)
Angela Bofill
"People Make the World Go 'Round" (1979), "Angel of the Night", (1979), "Something About You" (1981)
Hamilton Bohannon
"Disco Stomp" (1975), "Let's Start the Dance" (1978), "Fire Cracker" (1979), "Disco Symphony" (1979)
Boney M.
"Daddy Cool" (1976), "Sunny" (1976), "Ma Baker" (1977), "Belfast" (1977), "Rivers Of Babylon" (1978), "Rasputin" (1978), "Hooray Hooray It's A Holi Holiday" (1979),  "Gotta Go Home" (1979), "Painter Man" (1979), "We Kill The World" (1981), "Young Free & Single" (1985)
Taka Boom
"Night Dancin'" (1979), "To Hell With Him" (1983)
Booster
"Dance Like A Robot" (1978)
Patti Boulaye
"Funky Love" (1976), "Stop It, I Like It" (1979), "Disco Dancer" (1979)
David Bowie
"1984" (1974), "Fame" (1975), "Golden Years" (1976), “The Secret Life of Arabia” (1978), "John, I'm Only Dancing (Again)" (1979), "Fashion" (1980), "Let's Dance" (1983)
Brainstorm
"We're on Our Way" (1976), "Lovin' Is Really My Game" (1977), "Hot for You" (1978), "Case of the Boogie" (1979)
Bill Brandon
"We Fell in Love While Dancing" (1977)
Laura Branigan
"Gloria" (1982), "Self Control" (1984), "The Lucky One" (1984), "Spanish Eddie" (1985), "Shattered Glass" (1987), "Dim All The Lights" (1995)
Brass Construction
"Movin'" (1976), "Changin'" (1976), "Ha Cha Cha" (1977), "Screwed" (1977), "Starting Tomorrow" (1978), "One To One" (1978), "Get Up" (1978), "Get Up to Get Down" (1979)
Brenda and the Tabulations
"Everybody's Fool" (1979)
Brenda Mickens & The Plain English Band
"One More Time" (1986)
Brick
"Dazz" (1976), "Dusic" (1977)
The Brides of Funkenstein
"Disco to Go" (1978)
Alicia Bridges
"I Love The Nightlife (Disco Round)" (1978), "Body Heat" (1979)
Johnny Bristol
"Hang On In There Baby" (1974), "Do It to My Mind" (1976), "I Sho Like Groovin' With You" (1976)
Pattie Brooks
"Let's Make Love to the Music" (1977), "Love-Shook" (1977), "After Dark" (1978), "Heartbreak in Disguise" (1978), "Got Tu Go Disco" (1979), "Party Girl" (1979)
The Brothers Johnson
"Get the Funk out of ma Face" (1976), Stomp!" (1980), "Light Up The Night" (1980)
James Brown
"Hot Pants - Pt1" (1971), "Make it Funky - Pt1" (1971), "Stoned to the Bone" (1973), "Hustle!!! (Dead on it)" 1975), "Sex Machine" (1975), "Get Up Offa That Thing" (1976), "Bobyheat" (1976), "It's Too Funky In Here" (1979)
Jocelyn Brown
 "I'm Caught Up (In A One Night Love Affair)" (1979), "Somebody Else's Guy" (1984)
Miquel Brown
"Symphony of Love" (1978), "The Day They Got Disco in Brazil" (1979), "This Is Something New to Me" (1979), "So Many Men, So Little Time" (1983), "Beeline" (1983), "He's A Saint He's A Sinner (1984)
Peter Brown
"Do Ya Wanna Get Funky With Me" (1977), "Dance With Me" (with Betty Wright) (1977), "Crank It Up (Funk Town)" (1979), "It's Alright" (1979)

C
C.J. & Company
"We Got Our Own Thing" (1977), "Devil's Gun" (1977), "Big-City Sidewalk" (1978)
Cab Calloway
"Minnie the Moocher" (1978)
Capricorn
"Capricorn" (1980), "Pow Pow Pow" (1981), "I Need Love" (1982)
CarCrash
"Dancin' In The Neonlights" (1980),
Carl Carlton
"Everlasting Love" (1974), "She's A Bad Mama Jama" (1981), "Baby I Need Your Loving" (1982)
The Carpenters
"(Want You) Back in My Life Again" (1981)
Ralph Carter
"When You're Young and In Love" (1975), "Extra Extra (Read All about It)" (1975)
David Cassidy
"Get It Up For Love" (1975), "Hurt So Bad" (1979)
Verónica Castro
"Yo Creo en el Manana" (1979)
Cerrone
"Love In C-Minor" (1976), "Cerrone's Paradise" (1977), "Supernature" (1978), "Call Me Tonight" (1979)
The Chakachas
"Jungle Fever" (1972)
Marilyn Chambers
"Benihana" (1977)
Gene Chandler
"Get Down" (1978), "When You're #1" (1978), "That Funky Disco Rhythm" (1979), "Dance Fever" (1979)
Chanson
"Don't Hold Back" (1978), "Jack Be Nimble" (1978), "I Can Tell" (1979)
Tina Charles
"I Love to Love (But My Baby Loves to Dance)" (1976), "Dance Little Lady Dance" (1976), "Dr Love" (1976), "Disco Fever" (1976), "Love Bug" (1977), "Time for a Change of Heart" (1977), "I'll Go Where Your Music Takes Me" (1977), "Boogie around the Clock" (1979)
Charo (with the Salsoul Orchestra)
"Dance a Little Bit Closer" (1977), "(Mamacita) Dónde Está Santa Claus?" (1978), "Stay with Me" (1978), "Concierto De Aranjuez" (1979), "Hot Love" (1979), "The Love Boat Theme" (1979)
Cher
"Take Me Home" (1979), "Wasn't It Good" (1979), "Hell on Wheels" (1979), "Bad Love" (1980), "Believe" (1999), "All or Nothing" (1999), "Strong Enough" (1999)
Chéri
"Murphy's Law" (1982)
Karen Cheryl
"Sing To Me Mama (1978), "Sweet Melody" (1978), "Tchoo Tchoo (Hold on The Line)" (1979)
The Chi-Lites
"You Don't Have To Go" (1976), "Higher" (1979), "Hot On A Thing (Called Love)" (1981)
Chic
"Dance Dance Dance (Yowsah, Yowsah, Yowsah)" (1977), "Everybody Dance" (1977), "Le Freak" (1978), "I Want Your Love" (1978), "Chic Cheer" (1978), "Good Times" (1979), "My Forbidden Lover" (1979), "Rebels Are We" (1980)
Chicago
"Street Player" (1979)
Chilly
"For Your Love" (1978)
Alisha Chinai (India)
Zubi Zubi (1987), Zindagi Meri Dance (1987), Babusha (1988), Superman (1988), Made in India (1995), Lover Girl (1995)
The Choice Four
"Is It Love?" (1975)
Chromium
"Fly On UFO" (1978), "Caribbean Air Control" (1978)
Chuck Cissel
"Cisselin' Hot" (1979)
Claire 
"High On Love" (1978)
Petula Clark
"Downtown '77" (1977), "La Chanson D'Evita" (1977), "Just A Dance With Time" (1978)
Linda Clifford
"From Now On" (1977), "Runaway Love" (1978), "If My Friends Could See Me Now" (1978), "Don't Give It Up" (1979), "Bridge Over Troubled Water" (1979), "Red Light" (1980), "Lonely Night" (1980), "Bailin' Out" (1980), "Shoot Your Best Shot" (1980)
Natalie Cole
"This Will Be (An Everlasting Love)" (1975), "Mr. Melody" (1976), "Annie Mae" (1977), "Stand By" (1979), "Don't Look Back" (1980)
The Commodores
"Machine Gun" (instrumental) (1974), "The Bump" (1974) "Slippery When Wet" (1975), "Fancy Dancer" (1976), "Brick House" (1977), "Too Hot Ta Trot" (1978), "Midnight Magic" (1979), "Lady (You Bring Me Up)" (1981)
Norman Connors
"Once I've Been There" (1977), "Disco Land" (1979)
Annie Cordy 
"The Queen Of The Disco" (1978)
Alec R. Costandinos (France)
"Romeo & Juliet" (1977)
Floyd Cramer
"Theme from the Television Series 'Dallas'" (1980)
Randy Crawford
"Blue Flame" (1980)
Papa John Creach
"Joyce" (1976)
Crown Heights Affair
"Dreaming a Dream" (1975), "Every Beat of My Heart" (1976), "Do It Your Way" (1976), "Dream World" (1978), "Dance, Lady, Dance" (1979), "You Gave Me Love" (1980)
The Crusaders
"Street Life" (1979)
Chantal Curtis
"Get Another Love" (1979), "Hit Man" (1979), "Hey Taxi Driver" (1979)
Clem Curtis
"Unchained Melody/Need Your Love" (1979)

D
Dalida
"J'attendrai" (1975), "Besame Mucho" (1976), "Femme est la nuit" (1977), "Génération 78" (1978), "Ça me fait rêver" (1978), "Laissez-moi Danser" (1979), "Gigi in Paradisco" (1980)
Dalton & Dubarri
"I (You) Can Dance All By My- (Your-) Self" (1979)
Dana
"Fairytale" (1976), "Break the Ice" (1979), "Somethings Cooking In The Kitchen" (1979), "I Feel Love Comin' On" (1982)
Sarah Dash (Former The Bluebelles)
"Sinner Man" (1978), "(Come and Take This) Candy from your Baby" (1979)
Dave & Sugar
"Stay With Me" (1979), "It's A Heartache" (1981)
Helen Davis
"(I Can't Get No) Satisfaction" (1977) 
Sammy Davis, Jr.
"Baretta's Theme (Keep Your Eye on the Sparrow)" (1976), "That Old Black Magic" (1979)
DD Sound
"1234 Gimme Some More" (1977)
The Dear Hunter
"King of Swords (Reversed)" (2015)
The Dells
"Face to Face" (1979), "All About The Paper" (1980), "Your Song" (1980)
Teri DeSario
"Ain't Nothing Gonna Keep Me From You" (1978), "The Stuff That Dreams Are Made Of" (1978), "Moonlight Madness" (1979), "With You Love" (1979)
Daddy Dewdrop
"Nanu Nanu (I Wanna Funk with You)" (1978), "The Real Thing" (1979), "If You Wanna Wanna" (1979)
Gregg Diamond
"This Side of Midnight" (1978), "Fancy Dancer" (1978), "Danger" (1979), "Starcruiser" (1979)
Disco-Tex and the Sex-O-Lettes
"Get Dancin'" (1974), "I Wanna Dance Wit' Choo (Doo Dat Dance)" (1975)
The Doobie Brothers
"What A Fool Believes" (1978)
The Dooleys
"Wanted" (1979)
Double Exposure "Ten Percent" (1976), "Everyman Has To Carry His Own Weight" (1976)
Carl Douglas
"Kung Fu Fighting" (1974), "Dance The Kung Fu" (1974)
Carol Douglas
"Doctor's Orders" (1975), "Midnight Love Affair" (1976), "I Want to Stay with You" (1977), "Night Fever" (1978), "Fell in Love for the First Time Today" (1978), "I Got the Answer" (1979), "Come into My Life" (1979)
Lamont Dozier
"Boogie Business" (1979), "Going Back to My Roots" (1977)
Dr. Buzzard's Original Savannah Band
"Sour And Sweet" (1976), "I'll Play The Fool" (1976)
"Cherchez La Femme" (1975)
Dschinghis Khan
"Dschinghis Khan" (1979), "Moskau"(1980)
Ronnie Dyson
"If the Shoe Fits" (1979), "Couples Only" (1979)

E
Charles Earland
"Drifting" (1977), "Over and Over" (1978), "Let the Music Play" (1978)
The Earls
"Tonight (Could Be The Night)" (1977)
Earth, Wind & Fire
"Shining Star" (1975), "Getaway" (1976),  "Serpentine Fire" (1977),  "Fantasy" (1978), "Got to Get You Into My Life” (1978), “September" (1978), "Boogie Wonderland" (duet with The Emotions) (1979), "Let's Groove" (1981)
Cleveland Eaton
"Bama Boogie Woogie" (1976), "The Funky Cello" (1978)
Yvonne Elliman
"(I Don't Know Why) I Keep Hangin' On" (1977), "If I Can't Have You" (1978), "Love Pains" (1979)
ELO
"Showdown" (1973), "Sweet Talkin' Woman" (1976), "Shine A Little Love" (1979), "Last Train To London" (1979), "All Over The World" (1979)
Emily Starr Explosion
"Santiago Lover" (1978), "No No Sherif" (1979)
The Emotions
"Best Of My Love" (1977), "Flowers" (1977), "I Don't Want To Lose Your Love" (1977), "Boogie Wonderland" (duet with Earth, Wind & Fire) (1979), "I Should Be Dancing" (1979)
Eruption
"I Can't Stand The Rain" (1978), "One-Way Ticket" (1979)
Gloria Estefan (with the Miami Sound Machine)
"Live Again" (1977), "I Want You To Love Me" (1978), "You've Broken My Heart" (1979), "Regresa A Mí" (1980), "You're All I Have" (1980), "Baila Conmigo" (1981), "Sola" (1981), "No Será Fácil" (1982), "A Toda Máquina" (1983), "Dr. Beat" (1983), "Comunicación" (1983)
Dame Edna Everage
"Disco Matilda" (based around Waltzing Matilda) (1979)

References